Chaser (or Chacer) first appeared under that name in British records in 1786. She had been launched in 1771 at Philadelphia under another name, probably Lord North. Lord North became Cotton Planter, and then Planter, before she became Chaser. Between 1786 and 1790 Chaser made four voyages as a whaler in the British southern whale fishery. She then became a merchantman. In 1794 a privateer captured her but the Spanish recaptured her. She became a Liverpool-based Slave ship in the triangular trade in enslaved people. In 1796 she was condemned in West Africa on her first voyage in the triangular trade before she could embark any enslaved people.

Lord North
Lord North first appeared in Lloyd's Register (LR), in 1776.

Cotton Planter
Lord North became Cotton Planter.

On 24 August 1782 a gale drove Cotton Planter, Young, master, onto safe ground at "Isle Varow Point", in the River Shannon.

Planter
Cotton Planter became Planter.

Chaser
Planter  became Chaser. Chaser first appeared in Lloyd's Register (LR), in 1786.

1st whaling voyage (1786–1787): Captain Stephen Skiff sailed for the Brazil Banks in 1786. On 1 April 1787 Chaser, Skiff, master, was at Island Trinidada with four tuns of spermaceti and 40 tuns of whale oil. She returned to England on 2 July 1787 with five tuns of sperm oil, 70 tuns of whale oil, and 42 cwt of whale bone.

2nd whaling voyage (1787–1788): Captain C. Blandford sailed from England on 17 September 1787. Chaser returned on 27 June 1788 with 20 tuns of sperm oil, 80 tuns of whale oil, and 70 cwt of whale bone.

3rd whaling voyage (1788–1789): Captain C. Blanchford sailed from England on 6 September 1788. Chaser returned on 21 July 1789 with 25 tuns of sperm oil, 70 tuns of whale oil, and 58 cwt of whale bone.

4th whaling voyage (1789–1790): Captain Blanchford (or Blackford) sailed from England on 24 September 1789.
Chaser returned on 8 December 1790.

Although Lloyd's Register showed Chaser as continuing in the southern fishery, and one source accepts this information, there is no evidence in Lloyds Lists ship arrival and departure data to support it. On 4 March 1791 Lloyd's List showed Chacer, Funter, master, sailing from Deal to Africa. Within the month it reported that she had arrived at Dunkirk. There were no further mentions of Chacer until June 1794.

In June 1794 Chacer, King, master, sailed to Martinique. From there she sailed on to Jamaica. Lloyd's List reported in January 1795 that the French privateer Libertie had taken Chacer and Dorset, Edmonds, late master. However, a Spanish frigate had retaken the two British vessels and taken them into Havana.

Both Sarah and Amacree were slave ships that had delivered slaves to Havana and were on their way home. Sarah separated from Chaser on the 20th through the Gulf of Mexico, and from Amacree on the 29th, north of Bermuda. Lloyd's List reported in July 1795 that Chaser had returned to Liverpool.

Fate
Owner John Dawson next intended to sail Chaser as a slave ship. Captain Galbraith sailed from Liverpool on 20 November 1795. Lloyd's List reported in February 1796 that she had returned to Liverpool from westward of Newfoundland. From Liverpool Chacer sailed to Cork. Then on 15 April 1796 she was at Iles de Los. She had been on shore and sustained much damage; her cargo had been landed.

Chaser was condemned at Iles de Los before embarking any slaves.

The Liverpool merchant John Dawson was the or an  owner of Brothers, Chaser, and Union.

Notes

Citations

References
 
 

1771 ships
Age of Sail merchant ships of England
Whaling ships
Maritime incidents in 1782
Captured ships
Liverpool slave ships
Maritime incidents in 1796